The 1908 Kilkenny Senior Hurling Championship was the 20th staging of the Kilkenny Senior Hurling Championship since its establishment by the Kilkenny County Board.

On 16 May 1909, Mooncoin won the championship after a 5-17 to 3-05 defeat of Threecastles in the final. This was their fourth championship title overall and their first in two championship seasons.

Results

Final

References

Kilkenny Senior Hurling Championship
Kilkenny Senior Hurling Championship